Hypericum revolutum is a shrub or small tree in the genus Hypericum native to Arabia and Africa. It is evergreen, with leaves opposite, closely spaced and crowded at the ends of branches, c. 20 × 5 mm, green to slightly glaucous, sessile, clasping at the base. Single bright yellow flowers form at the ends of branches, up to 5 cm in diameter, blooming from June to November. Fruit is a reddish-brown capsule, up to 13 × 10 mm.

Hypericum revolutum is characteristic of the Afromontane vegetation, found from 1400 – 2593 meters elevation, and ranging from southwest Arabia through the Afromontane zones of eastern Africa to the Cape; it is also found in the Cameroon Highlands and Bioko, and on Madagascar, the Comoro Islands, and Réunion. It grows along streams in montane grassland and forest fringes.

References

 Flora of Zimbabwe: Species information: Hypericum revolutum

External links
 

Afromontane flora
revolutum
Taxa named by Martin Vahl
Flora of the Arabian Peninsula
Flora of Africa
Flora of Bioko
Flora of Madagascar
Flora of the Comoros
Flora of Réunion